Anne Wood, CBE (born 18 December 1937) is an English children's television producer, responsible for creating shows such as Teletubbies with Andrew Davenport. She is also the creator of Tots TV and Rosie and Jim. She was a recipient of the Eleanor Farjeon Award.

Early years
She was born in Spennymoor, County Durham, England, and grew up in Tudhoe Colliery, a small coal-mining village nearby.

Career
She qualified as a secondary school teacher through the Bingley Training College in Yorkshire and took up her first teaching post back home in Spennymoor. She married Barrie Wood in 1959 and moved to Surbiton in Surrey where she took up a teaching role at Hollyfield Road Secondary School.

This was the era of the first children's paperback book and Anne became an early pioneer of a children's paperback book club scheme for schools set up by Scholastic Publications. She retired from teaching on the birth of her daughter and was taken on by Scholastic as editor of their Children's Book Club.

Children’s books
When the Wood family moved to Byfleet in Surrey, she expanded her interest in how books and children's development could be brought together. In 1965, she founded and edited a quarterly magazine Books for Your Children, a publication aimed at parents, teachers, and librarians and fully supported by children's publishers. Initially the UK Arts Council supported the magazine with a small financial grant. As a further promotion of children's books, in 1969, Wood set up the Federation of Children's Book Groups, an organisation still in existence today. Also, in 1969, in recognition of her contribution to the promotion of children's books, Wood was awarded the Eleanor Farjeon Award.

Television producer
Tyne Tees Television for ITV 1977 Puzzle Party hosted by Gyles Brandreth and featuring Gnigel the Gnu
Yorkshire Television for ITV 1979 – 1983 Five series of The Book Tower, a programme aimed at stimulating children's interest in books. Hosts included Tom Baker and Stephen Moore. Winner of a Children's BAFTA in 1979 and 1982. Winner Prix Jeunesse 1980. 1982–1987 Three series of Ragdolly Anna based on the children's books by Jean Kenward. Innovative technology brought the ragdoll to life. The series starred Pat Coombs as the dressmaker owner of the ragdoll.
Head of Children's Programmes for TV-AM. In April 1983 introduced Roland Rat a character created by David Claridge in The Spectacular Shedvision Show. The series is generally regarded as the saviour of the ailing breakfast television service. Roland took the audience from 100,000 to 1.8 million. Wood produced six further series, Rat on the Road (1983), Roland's Winter Wonderland (1983), filmed in Switzerland, Roland Goes East (1984), filmed in Hong Kong, Rat on the Road II (1984), Operation Fog I (1984), Roland’s Countdown to Christmas (1984). Concurrent with Roland Rat Wood produced a Sunday morning series Rub-a-Dub-Tub – a magazine-style one-hour programme for very young children. It began transmission in February 1983.
Ragdoll Productions (UK) Limited: Wood founded her own independent children's television production company in 1984.

Productions (with first transmission years)
 Pob's Programme for Channel 4 1985–1987 (3 series); 2 special videos produced: Pob and Friends, (1988); Pob Goes to Hospital (1990)
 Playbox for ITV 1988–1989 (1 series) (35 programmes)
 The Magic Mirror for ITV 1989 (1 series) British animation series with live action opening and closing sequences. First sponsored (Kellogg's) children's programme series shown on British television.
 Boom! for Channel 4 1990–1991 (2 series) Innovative programme series aimed at giving "special needs" children a programme of equal status.
 Storytime (series 5-6) (1990) on BBC2
 Rosie and Jim for ITV 1990–2000 (8 series)
 Brum for BBC 1991–2002 (5 series)
 Tots TV for ITV 1993–1998 (8 series)
 Open a Door for BBC 1994–2003 (4 series)
 Teletubbies for BBC 1997–2001 (4 series) (365 programmes)
 Badjelly the Witch for BBC 2000 (movie) (Along with Norma Farnes)
 Teletubbies Everywhere (2002) on Cbeebies 
 Boohbah for GMTV and ITV 2003–2005 (2 series) (125 programmes)
 What Makes Me Happy for Five 2005 (1 series)
 Blips for ITV 2005–2006 (2 series)
 In the Night Garden... for BBC 2007–2009 (2 series) (100 episodes)
 Tronji for BBC 2009–2010 (2 series)
 The Adventures of Abney & Teal for BBC 2011–2012 (2 series)
 Dipdap for BBC 2011–2012 (1 series) (52 programmes)
 Twirlywoos for BBC 2015–2017 (4 series) (100 programmes)
 B.O.T. and the Beasties for BBC 2021 (1 series) (50 programmes)

Awards

Personal
1969 Eleanor Farjeon Award (for services to children's books)
1974 Ronald Politzer Award (for book promotion)
1997 The Baird Medal of the Royal Television Society, Midland Centre
1998 Fellowship of the Royal Television Society
1999 The Veuve Clicquot Award for Business Woman of the Year 1998
2000 Commander of the Order of the British Empire for Services to Children's Broadcasting
2000 BAFTA Special Award Outstanding Contribution in Children's Television and Film
2003 Women in Film & Television awards the Olswang Business Award
2007 The Harvey Lee Award for Outstanding Contribution to Broadcasting British Press Guild Awards
2010 Lifetime Achievement award from Mother and Baby Magazine
2013 Honorary Doctorate University of Birmingham
2014 Voice of the Listener and Viewer Award for Contribution to Children's Television

Productions, For Yorkshire TV
1979 Children's BAFTA (for The Book Tower) Harlequin Documentary/Factual
1980 Prix Jeunesse (for The Book Tower)
1982 Children's BAFTA (for The Book Tower) Children's Programme (Documentary/Factual)

Productions, As Ragdoll Productions

Brum
1990 New York Film & Television Festival
1991 New York Film & Television Festival
1991 Birmingham (UK) Film & Television Festival

Rosie and Jim
1992 TV Ontario Award

Magic Mirror
1990 New York Film & Television Festival (The Goose Girl, The Hobyahs, Jack & The Beanstalk)
1990 Chicago International Festival of Films

Tots TV
1993 TV Quick – Gold Award
1996 Prix Jeunesse
1996 Children's BAFTA (For Best Pre-School Live Action)
1997 Children's BAFTA (For Best Pre-School Live Action)
1997 Retail Marketing Award (Highly Commended) Awards of Excellence (Video Home Entertainment) "Fluffy Little Chicks"

Open a Door
1996 Prix Jeunesse for Brazilian episode "The Boy, The Slum and The Pan Lids"
1998 Festival of Light Filmfest, Seattle, USA Brazilian episode "Tezi" for “ Most Popular Film of the Festival Award"
1998 Seoul International Family Film Festival, Korea First Prize, Short Live-Film Section "Jasper", UK episode
2000 Prix Jeunesse "Tuli" (Namibia) BMW Special Prize for a programme with limited production facilities.
2000 Early Education 28th Contest of the Japan Prize for UK episode "Laura and Barry"
2001 Gold World Medal, Children's Special Category the New York Festivals Television Programming and Promotion Competition for the Open a door series
2002 Grand Award, Best Children's/Youth Programme the New York Festivals Television Programming and Promotion Competition for the Open a door series
2004 Gold World Medal the New York Festivals Television Programming and Promotion Competition for Open a door series 4
2004 The Japan Foundation President's Prize "Yolanda", Series 4, Open a door, South Africa episode Also one of the two runners-up in the Japan Prize Early Education Program Division
2005 BEST Live Action Short Film 7th Annual BAMKids Film Festival, Brooklyn Academy of Music (BAM), USA "Hic!”, Series 4, Open a door, USA episode

Badjelly the Witch
2002 Finalist Certificate Children's Programs Category the New York Festivals Television Programming and Promotion Competition.

Teletubbies
1997 Grand Prize: Winner, Pre-School Education Category 24th Japan Prize International Contest, Tokyo
1997 City of Birmingham (UK) Award Best Midlands Produced Children's Television Production of 1997 (Celebrating a unique contribution to the media industry in the region)	
1997 Royal Television Society the Children's Entertainment Award
1997 Video programmes award – Awards for excellence (Video Home Entertainment)
1998 The NATS Indies children's award Sixth Annual Awards for Independent Television Productions
1998 Children's BAFTA Best Pre-School Programme
1999 The Nickelodeon Indies Children's Award Seventh Annual Awards for Independent Television Productions
1999 International Licensing Industry Merchandisers' Association 17th Annual Awards GALA in New York
License of the Year
Entertainment/Character license of the year
Entertainment/Character License of the year/Hard Goods (to Hasbro Inc for Teletubbies)
Entertainment/Character License of the year/Soft Goods (to Children's Apparel Network for Teletubbies Apparel)
International Licensing Agency of the year (awarded to BBC Worldwide and Ragdoll)
2000 BBC Audicall Indies Children's award Eighth annual awards for Independent Television Production (third consecutive year of winning at the Indies)
2000 Royal Television Society Best Pre-School & Infants Award
2003 Ghana's TV and Radio Programme Awards Best Children's Programme
2005 MUMSNET Best DVDs for 0-1s and 1-2s
2014 Joint Winner of the Most Edgy Programme of the last 50 Years at Prix Jeunesse 2014
2014 Runner-up in the Great Impact Programme of the last 50 Years at Prix Jeunesse 2014

Teletubbies Everywhere
2002 Children's BAFTA Best Pre-School Live Action Award

Boohbah
2004 The Flash Festival – Paris Best Website Experimental Category – www.boohbah.tv

What Makes Me Happy
2007 Golden Butterfly Award – Iran Best Short or Medium-length Video – at 2007 International Festival of Film for Children and Young Adults
2007 9th China Children's Film Festival Special Award – Ningbo, China As selected by a viewer panel composed solely of children
2008 37th ROSHD International Film Festival, Iran Golden Statue Award to "Mahmoud’s Film" (Palestine)
2009 Chicago Children's International Film Festival "Angelina’s Film" (South Sudan) nominated
2009 Cine Golden Eagle Award Washington, USA "Angelina’s Film" (South Sudan)
2011 Cine Golden Eagle Award Washington, USA "Jose’s Film" (Colombia)			
2011 Toronto International Film & Video Festival "Tung’s Film" (Vietnam) Best Children's Category

In the Night Garden...
2007 BAFTA Children's Best Pre-school Live Action Programme
2007 British Toy Retailers' Association UK Toy of the Year – Igglepiggle Blanket Time
2008 Australian Toy Association Australian Toy Hobby & Nursery Fair Pre-school Licensed Product of the Year – Igglepiggle Blanket Time
2008 BAFTA Children's Best Pre-school Live Action Programme
2008 Licensing Awards 2008 Best Licensed Toys or Games Range in the Night Garden Toy Range from Hasbro
2008 Licensing Awards 2008 Best Baby/Pre-School Licensed Property (aimed at 0- to 5-year-olds) In the Night Garden
2008 Licensing Awards 2008 Best Food or Drink Range in the Night Garden Confectionery Range from Bon Bon Buddies
2008 Right Start Magazine Best Toy Awards in the Night Garden Sit & Ride, MV Sport & Leisure Ltd for Best Use of Character for the Tombliboos in the Night Garden Gazebo Ball Pool, Martin Yaffe won the Outdoor Category in the Night Garden Wooden Ninky Nonk Stacking Train, DanJam was Highly Commended in the Mini Movers Category
2008 Toy Retailers Association Pre-School Range 2008 in the Night Garden by Hasbro
2010 Broadcast Magazine Award Best Pre-school show
2010 Voice of the Listener & Viewer Award for Excellence in Broadcasting Best Children's Television Programme

Dipdap
2011 Children's BAFTA Best Children's Short Form Programme

References

External links

Ragdoll Productions
"Ragdoll founder fears for children's TV" by Tara Conlan: Guardian Friday March 23 2007 (include's portrait)
The Ragdoll Foundation

1937 births
Living people
British television producers
British women television producers
Commanders of the Order of the British Empire
People from Spennymoor